Jakub Bartek (born 1 July 1992 in Prešov) is a Slovak football defender who currently plays for TJ ŠM Dulová Ves.

1. FC Tatran Prešov
He made his debut for Tatran Prešov against Slovan Bratislava on 14 July 2012.

References

External links
1. FC Tatran Prešov profile
UEFA profile

1992 births
Living people
Slovak footballers
Association football defenders
1. FC Tatran Prešov players
Partizán Bardejov players
Slovak Super Liga players
Sportspeople from Prešov